Mount Rummage is a conical, bare rock mountain, 1,510 m, on the west side of Ramseier Glacier. It is the westernmost mountain along the north wall of Byrd Glacier. Named by Advisory Committee on Antarctic Names (US-ACAN) for Chief Laurence A. Rummage, QMCM, U.S. Navy, who took part in Christchurch transport and schedule operations for U.S. Navy Operation Deepfreeze, 1965.
 

Mountains of Oates Land